The 1960 United States presidential election in Michigan took place on November 8, 1960, as part of the 1960 United States presidential election. Voters chose 20 representatives, or electors, to the Electoral College, who voted for president and vice president.

Michigan was won by Senator John F. Kennedy (D–Massachusetts), running with Senator Lyndon B. Johnson, with 50.85% of the popular vote against incumbent Vice President Richard Nixon (R–California), running with United States Ambassador to the United Nations Henry Cabot Lodge, Jr., with 48.84% of the popular vote. This was the first time a Democratic candidate won Michigan since Franklin D. Roosevelt in 1944.

Michigan weighed in for this election as almost 2% more Democratic than the nation-at-large. Kennedy’s victory was the first of three consecutive Democratic victories in the state, as Michigan would not vote Republican again until Nixon won the state in his re-election bid in 1972.

Results

Results by county

See also
 United States presidential elections in Michigan

References

Michigan
1960
1960 Michigan elections